Antonio Márquez Ramírez (May 22, 1936 – October 22, 2013) was a Mexican football referee, born in San Juan de los Lagos. He is known for having refereed two matches in the 1986 FIFA World Cup in Mexico. He retired shortly after the World Cup, his last match was between América v Chivas de Guadalajara at the Estadio Azteca which culminated in a big fight between the two teams.

References

External links 
 
 
 

1936 births
2013 deaths
People from San Juan de los Lagos, Jalisco
Mexican football referees
FIFA World Cup referees
1986 FIFA World Cup referees
Sportspeople from Jalisco
AFC Asian Cup referees